Espero has been borne by at least three ships of the Italian Navy and may refer to:

 , a  launched in 1904 renamed Turbine in 1921 and discarded in 1923.
 , a  launched in 1927 and sunk in 1940.
 , a  launched in 1983.

Italian Navy ship names